Hygrophila costata, with the common names glush weed, gulf swampweed, and yerba de hicotea, is an aquatic plant.

The plant is endemic to, is native to Neotropic ecoregions. It is native to Florida, the Caribbean, southern Mexico, Central America, and South America.

This plant is cited in Flora Brasiliensis by Carl Friedrich Philipp von Martius, and is found in the Cerrado ecoregion of Brazil.

In addition, Hygrophila costata is an invasive and dominating species in several parts of the world included Australia because this plant is usually like a freshwater aquarium plant.

External links
 GRIN-Global Web v 1.9.7.1: taxonomy for Hygrophila costata — with distribution range info.
PIER−Pacific Island Ecosystems at Risk: species info for Hygrophila costata
 Unicamp.br: Hygrophila costata photos
 Flora Brasiliensis: Hygrophila costata 
PIER−Pacific Island Ecosystems at Risk: species info for Hygrophila costata
BFNS.org.au: Hygrophila costata
NSW.gov.au: Hygrophila costata
Weeds.org.au: Hygrophila costata

costata
Aquatic plants
Flora of Central America
Flora of the Caribbean
Flora of northern South America
Flora of southern South America
Flora of western South America
Flora of Brazil
Flora of the Cerrado
Flora of Florida
Flora of Southwestern Mexico
Flora of Veracruz
Neotropical realm flora
Flora without expected TNC conservation status